Marmoricola bigeumensis is a Gram-positive and aerobic bacterium from the genus Marmoricola which has been isolated from soil from a farming field on the Bigeum Island, Korea.

References

External links 
Type strain of Marmoricola bigeumensis at BacDive -  the Bacterial Diversity Metadatabase

Propionibacteriales
Bacteria described in 2008